Sondorillo District is one of eight districts of the province Huancabamba in Peru.

References